The cabinet led by Prime Minister Amin Hafez was one of the short-lived cabinets of Lebanon. It was inaugurated on 25 April 1973, succeeding the cabinet led by Saeb Salam who resigned on 10 April 1973. The tenure of the Hafez cabinet ended on 18 June 1973 following the Parliament's motion of no confidence.

Overview
Prime Minister Saeb Salam and his cabinet resigned on 10 April 1973 when the Israeli forces attacked the headquarters of Palestinians in Lebanon and killed three Palestinians who were the leaders of the Black September Organization. Upon this incident due to pressures from the Sunni community Salam requested the dismissal of the commander of the Lebanese army, Iskandar Ghanem, which was not accepted by the President Suleiman Frangieh. Because Ghanem was a close ally of Frangieh and a Maronite. 

Frangieh first asked Rashid Karami and then Abdallah Yafi to establish a new cabinet, but both declined his proposal. Then he asked Amin Hafez to form the cabinet, and he was given the task on 18 April 1973. Hafez was an academic and did not hold any cabinet post, but had been a member of the Lebanese Parliament since 1960 representing Tripoli. At the Parliament he was part of the group headed by Rashid Karami. Hafez had good relations with other political leaders such as Kamal Jumblatt, Kamel Asaad and the outgoing Prime Minister Saeb Salem who supported his appointment. However, just before the announcement of the cabinet members the violence between the Lebanese army and the Palestine Liberation Army intensified due to the Israeli attack mentioned above. Because of these tensions the leading supporters of Hafez demanded his resignation to reduce the capacity of President Frangieh to attack against Palestinians. Hafez did not approve their request stating that as a prime minister he could diminish these attacks.

Cabinet members
The cabinet was composed of 17 members which were announced on 25 April. Only six members were newcomers, and the others served in the previous cabinet. Their distribution based on the sectarian affiliation was as follows: Armenian Orthodox (1); Druze (1); Greek Catholic (2); Greek Orthodox (2); Maronite (4); Shiite (3) and Sunni (4).

List of ministers
The cabinet was made up of the following members:

Motion of no confidence
On 12 June 1973 the Parliament met for the voting of confidence session. At least 51 members of the Parliament should vote in favor of the cabinet, but 32 members boycotted the voting session and four members did not attend it due to several reasons. Interestingly, two members of the cabinet, Bahij Tabbara and Zakariya Nsouli, did also not attend the session. Next day all three submitted their resignations to the President. Takieddine Al Solh was designated to form a new cabinet on 18 July 1973.

References

External links

1973 establishments in Lebanon
1973 disestablishments in Lebanon
Cabinets of Lebanon
Cabinets established in 1973
Cabinets disestablished in 1973